"Point of Departure" is a 1966 Australian television film. It screened as part of Wednesday Theatre. Australian TV drama was relatively rare at the time.

Plot
A boy and a girl meet in a small provincial town at the beginning of German occupation in World War II.

Cast
Ross Thompson as Orpheus
Liza Goddard as Eurydice
Tom Oliver
Patricia Hill
Raymond Westwell
Diana Davidson
James Condon

Production
Ross Thompson had previously been in The Pigeon for Australian Playhouse. He had Goddard had acted in a scene together in They're a Weird Mob. Point of Departure had a cast of fifteen.

Reception
The Sydney Morning Herald write that Ross Thompson's "sensitive and convincing acting made the best of the obvious weaknesses in the plot itself."

References

External links
 

1966 television plays
1966 Australian television episodes
1960s Australian television plays
Black-and-white television episodes
Wednesday Theatre (season 2) episodes